Bolatlı is a town in Tarsus district of Mersin Province, Turkey. The population is 1563. as of 2011.

References

Villages in Tarsus District